Przevalski's parrotbill (Sinosuthora przewalskii) or the rusty-throated parrotbill, is a species of parrotbill in the family Paradoxornithidae. It is endemic to a small area of central China. Its natural habitat is temperate forests. It is threatened by habitat loss.

References

 Robson, C. (2007). Family Paradoxornithidae (Parrotbills) pp.  292–321 in; del Hoyo, J., Elliott, A. & Christie, D.A. eds. Handbook of the Birds of the World, Vol. 12. Picathartes to Tits and Chickadees. Lynx Edicions, Barcelona.

Przevalski's parrotbill
Birds of Central China
Endemic birds of China
Przevalski's parrotbill
Taxonomy articles created by Polbot